Jamaree Tyreez Salyer (born July 13, 2000) is an American football offensive tackle for the Los Angeles Chargers of the National Football League (NFL). He played college football at Georgia and was drafted in the sixth round of the 2022 NFL Draft by the Chargers.

Early life and high school
Salyer grew up in Atlanta, Georgia and attended Pace Academy. Salyer was rated a five-star recruit and committed to play college football at Georgia after considering offers from Alabama, Clemson, and Ohio State.

College career
Salyer played in 13 games as a reserve offensive lineman in 13 during his freshman season. He played in 13 games with two starts as a sophomore and started at right tackle in Georgia's 26-14 win over Baylor in the 2020 Sugar Bowl. Salyer was named Georgia's starting left tackle going into his junior season after reporting to preseason training camp 30 pounds lighter than the previous season and putting together a strong performance. He started all of the Bulldogs' regular season games at left tackle and started in the 2021 Peach Bowl at left guard. After  considering entering the 2021 NFL Draft, he decided to return to Georgia for his senior season. On January 15, 2022, Salyer declared for the 2022 NFL Draft.

Professional career

Salyer was drafted by the Los Angeles Chargers in sixth round, 195th overall, of the 2022 NFL Draft. He was thrust into the starting lineup in Week 4 following an injury to left tackle Rashawn Slater, and remained the starter the rest of the season.

References

External links 
 Los Angeles Chargers bio
Georgia Bulldogs bio

Living people
American football offensive guards
Georgia Bulldogs football players
Players of American football from Atlanta
2000 births
Los Angeles Chargers players